Juan José Cartagena (c. 1815 – c. 1895) was Mayor of Ponce, Puerto Rico, from April 1876 to 4 July 1879, and again from February 1881 to October 1881.

First mayoral term (1876)
During the first of his mayoral terms, Cartagena was mayor of Ponce from April 1876 to 4 July 1879. Others who worked during his administration included Dr. Rafael del Valle, Dr. Manuel Pasarell, the journalist Mario Braschi, and historian Eduardo Neumann Gandía.

Cartagena is best remembered for overseeing the installation of the clock on the front facade of Casa Alcadia. The now famous clock was brought from London and its installation was performed under the care of Julio E. Steinacker. The clock cost 1,000 Spanish pesos ($1,000 ($ in  dollars)). It was installed on 13 August 1877, the same day that Ponce received the title of "City" by the Spanish Crown.  The construction of the Hospital Tricoche also occurred under Cartagena's administration, and on 11 December 1878 Cartagena gave an inaugural speech for the opening of the hospital.

Second mayoral term (1881)
Unlike his multi-year mayoral term in 1876 to 1879, Cartagena governed the municipality of Ponce in 1881 for only 8 months, from 
February through the end of September.

Honors
There is a street in Urbanización Las Delicias of Barrio Magueyes in Ponce named after him.

References

Further reading
 Fay Fowlie de Flores. Ponce, Perla del Sur: Una Bibliográfica Anotada. Second Edition. 1997. Ponce, Puerto Rico: Universidad de Puerto Rico en Ponce. p. 270. Item 1353. 
 M. Ubeda y Delgado. Isla de Puerto Rico: estudio histórico, geográfico, y estadístico de la misma. San Juan, Puerto Rico: Establecimiento tipográfico de El Boletin. 1878. (Universidad de Puerto Rico - Rio Piedras)

See also

 List of Puerto Ricans
 List of mayors of Ponce, Puerto Rico

Mayors of Ponce, Puerto Rico
1810s births
1890s deaths
Year of birth uncertain
Year of death uncertain